The Flight into Egypt is a composition for solo soprano and baritone, chorus, and chamber orchestra by the American composer John Harbison.  The work was commissioned by the Cantata Singers and Ensemble, of which Harbison was a former music director.  The piece won the 1987 Pulitzer Prize for Music.

Composition
The Flight into Egypt has a duration of 14 minutes and is composed in a single movement.  The text of the piece comes from Matthew 3:13-23 of the King James Bible.  Harbison described the composition in the score program notes, writing:

Instrumentation
The work is scored for solo soprano and baritone, SATB chorus, and an orchestra comprising two oboes, cor anglais, bassoon, three trombones (3rd doubling bass trombone), chamber organ, and strings.

Pulitzer surprise
When it was announced that Harbison had won the 1987 Pulitzer Prize for Music, the composer wasn't even aware he had been nominated.  In an interview with the Los Angeles Times, he said, "I had no idea anything of mine had been submitted. I was not even conscious of the possibility existing."  The work had been submitted by Harbison's publisher, Associated Music, without the composer's knowledge.  Harbison said of the event, "I guess you could look at the Zen of the situation: When you care the least about something, it's most likely to happen."

References

Compositions by John Harbison
1986 compositions
Compositions for chamber orchestra
Choral compositions
Pulitzer Prize for Music-winning works